Johangsan is a mountain in South Korea. It has an elevation of 951 metres.

See also
List of mountains of Korea

References

Mountains of South Korea